Penty may refer to:

Penty, A type of cottage
Penty (surname)